Cardiocondyla elegans is an ant species in the genus Cardiocondyla found in the Mediterranean region.

References

 Emery, C. 1869: Enumerazione dei Formicidi che rinvengonsi nei contorni di Napoli. Annali dell'Accademia degli Aspiranti Naturalisti, (2)2: 1-26. 
 Seifert, B. 2003: The ant genus Cardiocondyla (Insecta: Hymenoptera: Formicidae) - a taxonomic revision of the C. elegans, C. bulgarica, C. batesii, C. nuda, C. shuckardi, C. stambuloffii, C. wroughtonii, C. emeryi and C. minutior species groups. Annalen des Naturhistorischen Museums in Wien, 104(B): 203–338.
 

Myrmicinae
Insects described in 1869